Long Guang, which stands for Dragon Broadcast, is the radio station group that was once the Harbin Ren Min Guangbo Dian Tai, translated as Heilongjiang People's Broadcasting Station, which consists of several radio stations broadcasting from Harbin and the greater Heilongjiang Province area.  (Evidence of Harbin Ren Min Guangbo Dian Tai is in the BBS of this radio station).

Online at Long Guang Zai Xian Wang
The radio station represented by the Harbin Ren Min Guangbo Dian Tai is called Long Guang Zai Xian Wang.  In Chinese, "zai xian" stands for "online".  The website contains information about the terrestrial radio stations in Harbin and a bulletin board for listener feedback.  It is associated with Long Bei Jing through the Heilongjiang Radio & TV Group.  The facilities are located in Heilongjiang Television and Radio Broadcast Center in the Long Ta (Dragon Tower).

Long Guang Xinwen Wang - News Radio

Long Guang Xinwen Wang is the news broadcast of the Harbin Ren Min Guangbo Dian Tai group, which broadcasts at 94.6 FM and 621 AM.

List of Harbin Radio Stations

Long Guang also operates a station in Sanya in Hainan, Sanya Diantai Tianya zhi Sheng (Sanya Radio, Voice of Tianya; also known as "Sunny Radio"), on 104.6 FM (link: https://web.archive.org/web/20090527170402/http://www.hljradio.com/ty/).

References
Source: pinyin translated by Cozy Website

External links
 

Chinese-language radio stations
Mandarin-language radio stations
Radio stations in China
Mass media in Harbin